Josephite marriage, also known as spiritual marriage, chaste marriage, and continent marriage, is a religiously motivated practice in which a man and a woman marry and live together without engaging in sexual activity.

Catholicism

A feature of Catholic spiritual marriage, or Josephite marriage, is that the agreement to abstain from sex should be a free mutual decision, rather than resulting from impotence or the views of one party.

In senses beyond spiritual marriage, abstinence is a key concept of Church doctrine that demands celibacy of priests, monks, nuns and certain other officials in the Church. The doctrine established a "spiritual marriage" of church officials to their church; in order to better serve God, one had to disavow the demands and temptations of traditional marriage.  This rule was enforced by Henry II, Holy Roman Emperor, whose marriage to Cunigunde of Luxemburg was also a very famous spiritual marriage. 

Saints Louis and Zélie Martin professed to enter a spiritual marriage, but consummated a year later when directed by their confessor to do so. Of their nine children the five who survived to adulthood all became nuns, including Saint Thérèse de Lisieux.  

Occasionally, spiritual marriages may also be entered later in life, with the renunciation of sexual relations after raising a family to fully dedicate oneself to God.  In October 2001, John Paul II beatified a married couple, Luigi Beltrame Quattrocchi and Maria Corsini, who bore four children, but later in life lived separately and committed to a Josephite marriage.

See also

Asexuality
Bride of Christ
Josephines
Mariage blanc
Mystical marriage
Peijainen
Platonic love
Romantic friendship
Saint Joseph 
Sexual abstinence
Spiritual friendship (disambiguation)
Spiritual wifery
Sexless marriage
Syneisaktism
Yogic marriage

References

Further reading
Elliot, D. : Spiritual Marriage: Sexual Abstinence in Medieval Wedlock. Princeton University Press.
One Chaste Marriage, Four Kids, and the Catholic Church by Geoffrey Leavenworth Nov. 17, 2021, New York Times

Marriage and religion
Non-sexuality